Haliangium tepidum is a species of moderately halophilic myxobacteria. It produces yellow fruiting bodies, comprising several sessile sporangioles in dense packs. Its type strain is SMP-10 (= JCM 11304(T)= DSM 14436(T)).

References

Further reading
Hopwood, David A. Complex enzymes in microbial natural product biosynthesis, Part A: overview articles and peptides: overview articles and peptides. Academic Press, 2009.
Colegate, Steven M., and Russell J. Molyneux, eds. Bioactive natural products: detection, isolation, and structural determination. CRC press, 2007.

External links
LPSN
Type strain of Haliangium tepidum at BacDive -  the Bacterial Diversity Metadatabase

Myxococcota
Bacteria described in 2002